WTGY (95.7 MHz) is a Christian radio station licensed to Charleston, Mississippi and owned by Family Worship Center Church, Inc. The station began broadcasting on April 1, 1986, and was owned by Superior Broadcast Group. It initially aired a full-service format, featuring country music, and began airing southern gospel music in the 1990s. In 2002, the station was sold to Family Worship Center Church for $300,000.

References

External links

TGY
Radio stations established in 1986
1986 establishments in Mississippi